Men in Trees is an American romantic comedy-drama television series starring Anne Heche as relationship coach Marin Frist, which premiered on September 12, 2006, on ABC. The series is set in the fictional town of Elmo, Alaska, and concerns Marin Frist's misadventures in relationships. The premise showed at least superficial similarities to the HBO television series Sex and the City (on which series creator Jenny Bicks was a co-executive producer), which also featured a romantically oriented female writer. The protagonist's apparent "fish-out-of-water" feeling in a remote, small Alaskan town can be likened to CBS's Northern Exposure. The protagonists in both series were New Yorkers thrust into small town Alaskan societies. Filming for the series was based in Squamish, British Columbia, Canada.

Five episodes of the first production season, which had not yet been shown on ABC, debuted in New Zealand on the TV2 network in June and July 2007. The five carryover episodes aired on ABC after the first episode of the second production season, beginning October 19, 2007. 
Men In Trees was cancelled on June 11, 2008. Its final episodes aired that summer as a burn-off.

Scheduling
The show first aired on ABC with a preview on September 12, 2006, after the season premiere of Dancing with the Stars. The show initially aired on Fridays at 9 pm. ET.  From November 30, 2006, until March 2007 episodes aired Thursdays at 10 pm. The network announced on May 15, 2007, it would move to Fridays at 10pm for its second season. ABC held off five episodes for its second season.

Noting the absence of Men in Trees from ABC's schedule starting in March 2007, series creator Jenny Bicks reported in her blog for ABC that reruns of the show would be shown on ABC beginning in June 2007, continuing throughout the summer.  Reruns of the series' first season began airing on ABC on Thursday, June 28.

The series began the fall 2007 season airing Fridays at 10 pm. Following the end of the 2008 writers' strike, the show returned on February 27, 2008, in its new timeslot on Wednesdays at 10pm.

Characters

Main characters
 Marin Frist (Anne Heche)  Relationship coach, author, and radio host. She discovers that her fiancé Graham has been cheating on her and decides to start a new life in Elmo, Alaska.
 Annie O'Donnell (Emily Bergl)  Fan of Marin's books and Patrick's fiancée. She follows Marin to Alaska.
 Patrick O'Bachelorton (Derek Richardson)  Avid fan of Marin's books, runs the town inn and radio station; engaged to Annie. Patrick changed his last name to O'Bachelorton, after it was originally Bachelor, citing the influences as O' from (Annie) O'Donnell, Bachelor from his mother, and -ton from his biological father's last name, Washington. 
 Jane Burns (Seana Kofoed)  Marin's editor, falls for "plow guy".
 Jack Slattery (James Tupper)  Local biologist and Marin's love interest.
 Buzz Washington (John Amos) -Pilot of one of the only planes in and out of Elmo.  The biological father of Patrick from a tryst with Celia Bachelor.
 Ben Thomasson (Abraham Benrubi)  Owner of the town bar, The Chieftain, and the local hockey team, the Huskies. The town sports facility, Thomasson Center, is named after him. Allegedly made his fortune by inventing Wetnaps but left Seattle to get away from his various hangers-on. At the show's beginning, he and his wife Theresa are estranged but continue to live in the same house while Theresa conducts several affairs. When he and Sara resume their old relationship, he asks Theresa to move out. He and Theresa eventually reconcile.
 Sara Jackson (Suleka Mathew)  The town's former "working girl", single mother who now works at The Chieftain with one-time boyfriend Ben.
 Theresa Thomasson (Sarah Strange)  Ben's wife, once estranged from him, who works as the town barmaid.  Even though she and Ben are separated, they live under the same roof. It's only after Ben asks her to leave following the resumption of his relationship with Sara that she realizes how much she loves him. Theresa also reveals the motives behind her behavior: her marriage with Ben is her first relationship that hasn't turned abusive, and it scares her. She is a former backup singer for Jewel.
 Police Chief Celia Bachelor (Cynthia Stevenson)  Patrick's clingy, widowed mother. Celia's maiden name is Hisbut. (Episodes 14-36, recurring previously).
 Mai Washington (Lauren Tom)  Buzz's wife, an entrepreneur who sells various items taken from unclaimed luggage. (Episodes 14-36, recurring previously).

Recurring characters
 Jerome Robinsky (Timothy Webber)  Regular patron at the Chieftain. As the show progresses, bits of Jerome's past are revealed (for example, in "The Girl Who Cried Wolf," several pictures of a younger Jerome are seen with various world leaders, and in "Sonata in Three Parts," he reveals to Annie that he is a composer. His last name is also revealed.) He was previously involved with Annie's mother Mary Alice, but the relationship ended when Jerome discovered she had gone back to her husband. He composes a song for her, which he plays at Sam and Jane's wedding in New York.
 Carl (Adrian McMorran)
 Lynn Barstow (Justine Bateman)  Jack's pregnant ex-girlfriend who has again left Elmo because Jack didn't love her.
 Police Supervisor Richard Ellis (Currie Graham)  Celia Bachelor's boyfriend
 Sam Soloway/"Plow Guy" (Ty Olsson)  Jane's husband who drives a plow
 Stuart Maxson (Jason O'Mara)  Marin's book publisher
 Cash (Scott Elrod)  An attractive handyman who finishes repairing Marin's cabin in exchange for a place to live and has a secret: he's dying of kidney failure.
 Eric (Nicholas Lea)  The minister at the local church who dates Sara.
 George Washington (Orlando Jones)  Buzz Washington's gay son.
 Terri (Mario Cantone)  Elmo's only hairdresser, a New York transplant, and occasional boyfriend of George Washington. He donates a kidney to Cash.
 Ivan Palacinke (Diego Klattenhoff)  Croatian ice hockey player

Episodes

Season 1: 2006–07

Season 2: 2007–08
Season 2, consisting of 19 episodes, first premiered in New Zealand on the TV2 network on June 25, 2007 with "Chemical Reactions". Season 2 premiered on ABC on October 12, 2007 with the first produced episode of Season 2.

Ratings
Seasonal rankings (based on average total viewers per episode) of Men in Trees on ABC:

Production history
The series was given a 13 episode order at ABC's May 2006 upfronts, to debut in the fall of 2006, originally to follow Ugly Betty.  After that series was shifted to a lead time slot on Thursdays, Men in Trees eventually followed Friday encore episodes of Grey's Anatomy until November 30, when Trees was moved to follow first-run Grey's episodes.
On October 28, 2006, ABC ordered four more scripts to be written for the show. ABC then ordered a full season pickup for the show on November 8. It became the seventh new series to be given a full 22-episode order in the 2006-07 season.
Men in Trees was among several scripted series affected by the 2007-08 Writers Guild of America strike. In particular, 14 new episodes were written for the second season, versus an order for 22. Combined with five episodes carried over from the first production season, Men in Trees had 19 completed episodes for its second broadcast season in the United States and was on hiatus from late December 2007 until it returned on February 27, 2008, taking over for Cashmere Mafia. The series was not aired during the May 2008 sweeps period. On May 4, 2008, ABC announced the official cancellation of the show and said that the final episodes would be broadcast starting on May 28, 2008.

Critical reviews

References

External links

 
 Music Appearing in Men in Trees

2006 American television series debuts
2008 American television series endings
2000s American comedy-drama television series
American Broadcasting Company original programming
English-language television shows
Television series by Warner Bros. Television Studios
Television shows set in Alaska
Television shows filmed in Vancouver
2000s American romantic comedy television series